Margaret Gorman (August 18, 1905 – October 1, 1995) was an American model and beauty queen who was the winner of the first Miss America beauty pageant after being crowned Miss District of Columbia in 1921.

Pageantry

Gorman was a junior at Western High School in Washington, D.C. when her photo was entered into a popularity contest at the Washington Herald. 

She was chosen as Miss District of Columbia in 1921 at age 16 on account of her athletic ability, past accomplishments, and outgoing personality. As a result of that victory, she was invited to join the Second Annual Atlantic City pageant held on September 8, 1921, as an honored guest. There she was invited to join a new event: the "Inter-City Beauty" Contest. She won the titles "Inter-City Beauty, Amateur" and "The Most Beautiful Bathing Girl in America" after competing in the Bather's Revue.  She won the grand prize, the Golden Mermaid trophy.  She was expected to defend her positions the next year, but someone else had attained the title of "Miss Washington, D.C.," so she was instead crowned as "Miss America." She is the only Miss America to receive her crown at the end of the year.

Gorman was the lightest Miss America at 108 pounds until 1949, when Jacque Mercer of Phoenix, Arizona, weighed in at 106 and won the title.

Gorman later said: "I never cared to be Miss America. It wasn't my idea. I am so bored by it all. I really want to forget the whole thing." She still owned the sea green chiffon and sequined dress that she wore in the 1922 competition.

Personal life
Gorman continued to compete in 1922. In 1925, she married Victor Cahill, and was married until he died in 1957. She lived all her life in Washington D.C., became a socialite and enjoyed traveling. 

She died on October 1, 1995, aged 90.

References

External links

Margaret Gorman at MissAmerica.org
Margaret Gorman: First Miss America And Washingtonian

1905 births
1995 deaths
Miss America 1920s delegates
Miss America winners
People from Washington, D.C.